Marcel Marti (born 8 November 1983) is a Swiss ski mountaineer.

Marti was born in Interlaken. He competed first in the Diamir Race in 1998. He lives in Grindelwald. In 2007, in a team with Simon Anthamatten (leader), Ernest Farquet and Florent Troillet, he climbed the Matterhorn in a record time of 3 hours 45 minutes. The record was beaten by Andreas Steindl in 2011.

Selected results 
 2002:
 1st, Patrouille de la Maya B-course, together with Alain Richard and William Marti
 2003:
 1st (juniors), Trophée des Gastlosen, together with Alain Richard
 2004:
 1st (espoirs), Trophée des Gastlosen, together with Sébastien Nicollier
 2006:
 1st, Trophée des Gastlosen, together with Olivier Nägele
 2008:
 8th, World Championship team race (together with Jon Andri Willy)
 2009:
 3rd, European Championship relay race (together with Florent Troillet, Yannick Ecoeur and Pierre Bruchez)
 7th, European Championship single race
 7th, European Championship team race together with Yannick Ecoeur)
 2010:
 9th, World Championship team race (together with Yannick Ecoeur)
 2011:
 2nd, World Championship relay, together with Yannick Ecoeur, Marcel Theux and Martin Anthamatten
 6th, World Championship sprint
 2012:
 3rd, European Championship sprint

Patrouille des Glaciers 

 2006: 5th (and 3rd in  "senior I" class ranking), together with Emmanuel Vaudan and Alain Rey
 2008: 7th (and 1st in the international military teams ranking), together with Cpl Yannick Ecoeur and Garde-frontière Pierre Bruchez
 2010: 5th, together with Didier Moret and Pierre Bruchez

Pierra Menta 

 2008: 8th, together with Ernest Farquet
 2009: 5th, together with Florent Troillet

Trofeo Mezzalama 

 2009: 6th, together with Martin Anthamatten and Yannick Ecoeur
 2011: 5th, together with Martin Anthamatten and Yannick Ecoeur

External links 
 Marcel Marti at skimountaineering.com

References 

1983 births
Living people
Swiss male ski mountaineers
Swiss military patrol (sport) runners
People from Interlaken
Sportspeople from the canton of Bern